"That's It—I Quit—I'm Movin' On" is a song recorded by American singer Sam Cooke, released on February 14, 1961 by RCA Victor. Produced by Hugo & Luigi and arranged and conducted by Sammy Lowe, the song was a top 30 hit on Billboard Hot R&B Sides chart and the Billboard Hot 100.

Personnel

Credits adapted from the liner notes to the 2003 compilation Portrait of a Legend: 1951–1964.
Sam Cooke – vocals
 Ernie Hayes – piano

Charts and certifications

Weekly charts

References

1961 singles
Sam Cooke songs
Song recordings produced by Hugo & Luigi
1961 songs
RCA Victor singles
Songs with lyrics by Roy Alfred
Adele songs